John Kariuki (born 10 November 1986) is a Kenyan former long-distance runner. 

At the age of 14 he emigrated to Japan, where he attended Shiga Gakuen High School. After graduating from school, he started competing professionally for the Toyota Boshoku team.

He was a member of the team that set the world record for the Ekiden road relay on 23 November 2005 in the International Chiba Ekiden. The team, which consisted of Kariuki alongside Josephat Ndambiri, Martin Mathathi, Daniel Muchunu Mwangi, Mekubo Mogusu and Onesmus Nyerere, finished in a time of 1:57:06.

References

1986 births
Living people
Kenyan male long-distance runners
World Athletics record holders (relay)
20th-century Kenyan people
21st-century Kenyan people